A Dominions cricket team, representing the Dominions of the British Empire, played seven cricket matches, all in England during wartime. Only once did the team play at first-class level, when it played against England at Lord's in late August 1945. This was the seventh match of first-class status to be played in England since 1939.

All but two of the England team either already had, or would later gain, Test caps, and the other two (Eddie Phillipson and Jack Davies) would play over 150 first-class matches each, but the Dominions side was far more uneven in this regard. Cricketers including Learie Constantine (captaining the team in his final first-class match) and Keith Miller played with Hartley Craig for whom this was his only first-class game.

The Dominions won the toss and batted, and Donnelly's 133 helped them to 307 all out; Wright took 5–90. England's reply started badly as they fell to 96/6, but a stand of 177 between captain Hammond (121) and Edrich (78) saw them to 287. In their second innings, the Dominions' total of 336 was massively helped by Miller's 185; Wright claimed 5–105. Chasing 357 to win, 102 from Hammond and 56 from Davies were not enough and they were dismissed for 311; the Dominions thus won by 45 runs.

Representative Match

England team
Jack Robertson
Laurie Fishlock
James Langridge
Eddie Phillipson
Billy Griffith (wicket-keeper)
Wally Hammond (captain)
Harold Gimblett
Bill Edrich
Jack Davies
Doug Wright
Eric Hollies

Dominions team
Hartley Craig
Desmond Fell
Jack Pettiford
Keith Miller
Martin Donnelly
Learie Constantine (captain)
Cec Pepper
Bob Cristofani
Graham Williams
Reginald Ellis
Colin Bremner (wicket-keeper)

References
England v Dominions in 1945 – scorecard from CricketArchive. Retrieved 24 November 2006.

First-class cricket teams